Rites of Spring is the only studio album by American post-hardcore band Rites of Spring. It was recorded at Inner Ear Studios in February 1985 and released on vinyl in June 1985 as Dischord Records #16. The album was produced by Ian MacKaye and contains twelve songs.

The album was re-released on CD and cassette in 1987, with an additional track from the same session, "Other Way Around", as well as the four songs from the Rites' follow-up EP, All Through a Life (track 14–17), recorded January 1986 and released in 1987 (Dischord #22). End on End features the same cover as the debut album.

Music
Influenced by The Faith, Rites of Spring continued to combine desperate introspective lyrics with angry melody-tinged songwriting that moved even further from the hardcore punk formula.

Reception

The album was listed at number 30 on Kurt Cobain's top 50 favorite albums. Pitchfork online magazine ranked it number 96 on its list of the Top 100 Albums of the 1980s. It has appeared on various best-of emo album lists by Consequence of Sound, Kerrang!, LA Weekly, and Rolling Stone, as well as by journalists Leslie Simon and Trevor Kelley in their book Everybody Hurts: An Essential Guide to Emo Culture (2007). Metal Hammer named the album in their list of "the 10 essential post-hardcore albums."

Kelefa Sanneh described it as, "The first emo album, and still one of the greatest. It was a volatile album, with Picciotto screaming lyrics that a different singer may have chosen to whisper.

Track listing
All songs written by Rites of Spring.

Side one
"Spring" – 2:09
"Deeper Than Inside" – 2:17
"For Want Of" – 3:09
"Hain's Point" – 2:08
"All There Is" – 2:54
"Drink Deep" – 4:54

Side two
"Theme" – 2:19
"By Design" – 2:38
"Remainder" – 2:30
"Persistent Vision" – 2:21
"Nudes" – 2:48
"End On End" – 7:23

Personnel

Rites of Spring
 Guy Picciotto – vocals, guitar
 Eddie Janney – guitar
 Mike Fellows – bass
 Brendan Canty – drums

Additional performers
 Ian MacKaye – backing vocals

Production
 Ian MacKaye – production
 Michael Hampton – production

References
Citations

Sources

External links 
Rites of Spring at Dischord.com

1985 debut albums
Rites of Spring albums